The Bremer River is the name of several rivers in Australia:
Bremer River (Queensland) is a tributary of the Brisbane River
Bremer River (South Australia) flows into Lake Alexandrina near the end of the Murray River
Bremer River (Western Australia) flows to sea on the south coast between Albany and Esperance
Bremer River (Northern Territory) is on Melville Island (Northern Territory)